Phormidium is a genus of cyanobacteria in the family Oscillatoriaceae.

Species
83, including; Phormidium aerugineo-caeruleum

References 

 
Cyanobacteria genera